Risk: Global Domination is a game for the PlayStation 2, based upon the board game Risk, developed by Cyberlore Studios and published by Atari Interactive. It was released in 2003. An Xbox version was planned, but cancelled.

Gameplay
The game follows the board game. It can be played in three different forms: Classic, Secret Mission and Capital. Online play was also supported for up to 20 players.

In Risk: Global Domination, the player  tries to dominate the world by defeating eleven famous generals. When players accomplish certain goals they achieve medals such as, the Medal of Jasonic Meret, which is achieved by winning their 10th career game, the Order of the Liberator, which is awarded when conquering the 100th, and Dominato Veinti, which is awarded after achieving all 33 other medals. There are 34 medals to earn total.

Reception
The game received "mixed or average reviews" from critics, according to Metacritic.

References

External links
 Official page
 Game page at PlayStation.co.uk
 IGN.com Review
 GameSpot Xbox preview (version canceled)

PlayStation 2-only games
2003 video games
Risk (game)
Cancelled Xbox games
PlayStation 2 games
Video games based on board games
Video games developed in the United States
RenderWare games
Cyberlore Studios games